Eugenius of Toledo may refer to:
Eugenius I of Toledo (died 647), archbishop 
Eugenius II of Toledo (died 657), archbishop and saint